Struggle is a 2003 Austrian drama film directed by Ruth Mader. It was screened in the Un Certain Regard section at the 2003 Cannes Film Festival.

Cast
 Aleksandra Justa - Ewa
 Gottfried Breitfuss - Harold (as Gottfried Breitfuß)
 Margit Wrobel - Doctor
 Martin Brambach - Martin
 Rainer Egger

References

External links

2003 films
2000s German-language films
2003 drama films
Films directed by Ruth Mader
Austrian drama films